Verrastranda is a village located in the municipality of Steinkjer in Trøndelag county, Norway. It is located on the north shore of the Verrasundet arm of the Trondheimsfjord. Norwegian National Road 720 runs through the village. Verrastranda has a primary school.

Notable residents
Former member of the Norwegian Parliament André N. Skjelstad grew up in Verrastranda

References

Villages in Trøndelag
Steinkjer